The Tendrils of the Vine is a collection of 20 novellas by Colette, published in 1908. The first story, Les Vrilles de la vigne, was first published in Le Mercure musical on 15 May 1905.

It was ranked #59 in Le Monde's 100 Books of the Century.

Stories 
The editions currently in print follow Colette's 1934 revisions.

 "Les Vrilles de la vigne"
 "Rêverie de nouvel an"
 "Chanson de la danseuse"
 "Nuit blanche"
 "Jour gris"
 "Le Dernier Feu"
 "Amours"
 "Un rêve"
 "Nonoche"
 "Toby-Chien parle"
 "Dialogue de bêtes"
 "Maquillages"
 "Belles-de-jour"
 "De quoi est-ce qu'on a l'air ?"
 "La Guérison"
 "Le Miroir"
 "La Dame qui chante"
 "En baies de Somme"
 "Partie de pêche"
 "Music-halls"

References

Colette
French short story collections
1908 short story collections